Upshur County Schools is a school district in Upshur County, West Virginia, United States. The interim superintendent is Dr. Debra Harrison. The interim assistant superintendent is Melinda Stewart, the president is Dr. Tammy Samples, the vice-president is Jan Craig and the treasurer is Jeffrey Perkins.

Schools

High schools 
Buckhannon-Upshur High School
Fred W. Eberle Technical Center

Middle schools 
Buckhannon-Upshur Middle School

Elementary schools 
Buckhannon Academy Elementary School
French Creek Elementary School
Hodgesville Elementary School
Rock Cave Elementary School
Tennerton Elementary School
Union Elementary School
Washington District Elementary School

References

External links
Official site

Education in Upshur County, West Virginia
School districts in West Virginia